Campechuela is a municipality and town in Granma Province of Cuba. It is located on the southern shore of the Gulf of Guacanayabo.

History
The town of Campechuela was founded in 1869. It became the seat of the municipality in 1912.

Geography
The municipality is divided into the barrios of Cabecera (Campechuela town), Ceiba Hueca, Cienaguilla, La Gloria, San Ramón and Tana.

Demographics
In 2004, the municipality of Campechuela had a population of 46,092.

Economy
The economy is based on agriculture (with sugarcane and fruit farms) and stock raising.

See also

Circuito Sur de Oriente
Municipalities of Cuba
List of cities in Cuba

References

External links

Populated places in Granma Province